The Dominica First Division is the second-tier of football in Dominica. The top two teams each season are promoted to the Dominica Premiere League. The league is split into 3 groups each with 10 teams.

Clubs 
The following teams are known participants for the 2017–18 season:

 Kensbro
 Wacky Rollers

References

External links 
 DFA First Division

2
Dominica